Siah Darka (also Romanized as Sīāh Darkā and Seyāh Darkā) is a village in Babol Kenar Rural District, Babol Kenar District, Babol County, Mazandaran Province, Iran. At the 2006 census, its population was 1,129, in 290 families.

References 

Populated places in Babol County